Thandokhulu Secondary School is a school in Khayelitsha in the Western Cape.

External links
 

Schools in Cape Town